The following is a timeline of the history of the city of Bergamo in the Lombardy region of Italy.

Prior to 20th century

 45 BCE - Bergomum municipium established.
 4th C. CE - Roman Catholic Diocese of Bergamo established.
 894 CE - Bergamo besieged by forces of Arnulf of Carinthia.
 1108 CE - Comunal consuls elected.
 1137 - Santa Maria Maggiore church construction begins.
 1264 - Milanese in power.
 1336 -  (castle) built.
 1355 - Santa Maria Maggiore church completed.
 1408 - Pandolfo III Malatesta in power.
 1428 - Bergamo becomes part of the Venetian Republic.
 1476 - Cappella Colleoni (chapel) built.
 1513 - Artist Lorenzo Lotto moves to Bergamo.
 1549 - Population: 20,843.
 1561 -  construction begins.
 1764 - Biblioteca Civica Angelo Mai (library) founded.
 1776 - Population: 28,581.
 1780 - Accademia Carrara di Belle Arti di Bergamo (art academy) founded.
 1791 - Teatro Nuovo (theatre) opens.
 1797
 French client Republic of Bergamo created.
 Future composer Gaetano Donizetti born in Bergamo.
 1805 - Lezioni caritatevoli di musica (music school) founded.
 1814 - Austrians in power.
 1840 -  built.
 1857 - Bergamo railway station in operation.
 1859 -  (administrative area) established.
 1860 -  becomes mayor.
 1861 - Population: 37,343.
 1869 - Banca Popolare di Bergamo (bank) established.
 1871 - Natural Science Museum founded.
 1887 - Bergamo Funicular railway Upper Town - Lower Town (funicular) begins operating.
 1890 -  begins operating.
 1897
 Monument to Donizetti, Bergamo erected in the Piazza Cavour.
 Population: 45,929.

20th century

 1901 -  begins operating.
 1907
 City walls dismantled.
 Atalanta B.C. (football club) formed.
 1911 - Population: 55,306.
 1927 - Colognola del Piano, and Valtesse become part of Bergamo.
 1928
 Stadio Atleti Azzurri d'Italia (stadium) opens.
 Population: 81,400.
 1968 - Institute of Foreign Languages and Literature established.
 1983 -  (festival) begins.

21st century

 2009 - Bergamo–Albino light rail begins operating.
 2013 - Population: 115,072.
 2014 - Giorgio Gori becomes mayor.

See also
 
 List of mayors of Bergamo
 List of bishops of Bergamo
 Timeline of the Republic of Venice, of which Bergamo was part 1428-1797

Timelines of other cities in the macroregion of Northwest Italy:(it)
 Liguria region: Timeline of Genoa
 Lombardy region: Timeline of Brescia; Cremona; Mantua; Milan; Pavia
 Piedmont region: Timeline of Novara; Turin

References

This article incorporates information from the Italian Wikipedia.

Bibliography

in English
 
 
 
 
  (+ 1870 ed.)

in Italian
 
 P. Pesenti. Bergamo (Bergamo, 1910)
 
 B. Belotti. Storia di Bergamo e dei bergamaschi, 1–4 (Bergamo, 1959)
 V. Zanella. Bergamo città (Bergamo, 1971)

External links

 Archivio di Stato di Bergamo (state archives)
 Items related to Bergamo, various dates (via Europeana)
 Items related to Bergamo, various dates (via Digital Public Library of America)

 
Bergamo